Uwchlan may refer to:
Uwchlan Township, Pennsylvania
Upper Uwchlan Township, Pennsylvania